Tony O'Donnell (born March 7, 1961) is an American politician, who represented District 29C in the Maryland House of Delegates. In 2016, Governor Larry Hogan appointed him to the Maryland Public Service Commission.

Early life, education, and early career
O'Donnell attended Middletown Area High School in Middletown, Dauphin County, Pennsylvania.  He graduated from Naval Nuclear Propulsion School in 1980.  He received his B.S. from Regents College (now known as Excelsior University), University of the State of New York in 1985.

O'Donnell served in United States Navy, achieving a rank of E-6, from 1979-87. After the Navy, he was a supervisor for the Instrument Modifications Unit at Baltimore Gas & Electric's Calvert Cliffs Nuclear Power Plant. He received the Edward T. Hall Memorial Award for Outstanding Republican Man of the Year – Calvert County, Calvert County Republican Central Committee in 1993. In 2005, he received the Outstanding Employer Partner award from the Maryland Chamber of Commerce.

Maryland House of Delegates

Elections
O'Donnell was first elected in 1995 into the Maryland House of Delegates for District 29C, which covers parts of Calvert and St. Mary's Counties.  He defeated Thomas Michael Pelagatti by 32 votes. He was re-elected in 1998 (59%), 2002 (52%), 2006 (60%), and 2010 (57%).

Tenure

O'Donnell was Minority Whip in the Maryland House of Delegates from 2003 to 2006, and served as Minority Leader until 2013. In 2010, he was named one of the "Most Influential Maryland Legislators" (Top 20).

Voting Record
 voted against the Clean Indoor Air Act of 2007 (HB359)
 voted against in-state tuition for illegal immigrants in 2007 (HB6)
 voted against the Healthy Air Act in 2006 (SB154)
 voted for slots in 2005 (HB1361)
 voted for electric deregulation in 1999 (HB703)
 voted for income tax reduction in 1998 (SB750)

Committee assignments
Environmental Matters Committee (2007–15)
Agriculture, agriculture preservation & open space subcommittee (2007–08)
Environment subcommittee (2007–10)
Natural resources subcommittee (2007–15)
Local government & bi-county agencies subcommittee (2008–09)
Land use & ethics subcommittee (2011–15)
Rules and Executive Nominations Committee (2007–16)
Legislative Policy Committee (2007-2013)
Management subcommittee (2007-2013)
Judiciary Committee (1995-2004)
Family & juvenile law subcommittee (1995-2003)
Juvenile law subcommittee (2003–04)
Special Committee on Higher Education Affordability and Accessibility (2003–04)
Rules and Executive Nominations Committee (2003–04) 
Appropriations Committee (2004–06)
Health & human resources subcommittee (2005–06)
Pensions Oversight Committee (2005–06)
Joint Committee on the Selection of the State Treasurer (2007, 2011)

Caucus memberships
Maryland Legislative Sportsmen's Caucus (2001-)
Maryland Rural Caucus (2002-)
Taxpayers Protection Caucus (2003-)
Maryland Veterans Caucus (2011-)

2012 congressional election

In November 2011, O'Donnell announced his intention to run for the United States Congress representing Maryland's 5th congressional district currently held by Democratic incumbent Steny Hoyer. The 5th district spans from Anne Arundel, Calvert, Prince George's and Saint Mary's Counties.

Personal life
Tony O'Donnell and his wife, Lori, have three children and two grandchildren.

Electoral history
2006 Race for Maryland House of Delegates – District 26C
Voters to choose one:
{| class="wikitable"
|-
!Name
!Votes
!Percent
!Outcome
|- 
|Anthony J. O'Donnell, Rep.
|7,739
|  60.3%
|   Won
|-
|Norma Powers, Dem.
|5,091
|  39.6%
|   Lost
|-
|Other Write-Ins
|11
|  0.1%
|   Lost
|}

2002 Race for Maryland House of Delegates – District 27C
Voters to choose one:
{| class="wikitable"
|-
!Name
!Votes
!Percent
!Outcome
|- 
|Anthony J. O'Donnell, Rep.
|6,027
|  51.87%
|   Won
|-
|Pat Buehler, Dem.
|5,586
|  48.08%
|   Lost
|-
|Other Write-Ins
|6
|  0.1%
|   Lost
|}

1998 Race for Maryland House of Delegates – District 29C
Voters to choose one:
{| class="wikitable"
|-
!Name
!Votes
!Percent
!Outcome
|- 
|Anthony J. O'Donnell, Rep.
|8,401
|  59%
|   Won
|-
|John M. Gott, Dem.
|5,772
|  41%
|   Lost
|}

1994 Race for Maryland House of Delegates – District 29C
Voters to choose one:
{| class="wikitable"
|-
!Name
!Votes
!Percent
!Outcome
|- 
|Anthony J. O'Donnell, Rep.
|5,839
|  50%
|   Won
|-
|Thomas Michael Pelagatti, Dem.
|5,807
|  50%
|   Lost
|}

References and notes

External links
http://www.msa.md.gov/msa/mdmanual/06hse/html/msa12284.html
http://www.elections.state.md.us/elections/1990/results_1990/gahod.html

1961 births
Living people
Republican Party members of the Maryland House of Delegates
Politicians from Harrisburg, Pennsylvania
21st-century American politicians
Excelsior College alumni